Sywell Aerodrome  is the local aerodrome serving the towns of Northampton, Wellingborough, Kettering and Rushden, as well as wider Northamptonshire.

The aerodrome caters for private flying, flight training and corporate flights. There is one fixed-wing flying school, one microlight school and a helicopter school. The 1930s Art Deco hotel (built in 1934 as the Northamptonshire Aero Club clubhouse) has bar and restaurant facilities. Aviation related industries and businesses are also located at the aerodrome. A viewing area is provided for aircraft spotters where the airfield memorial is located. The Pilots' Mess cafe is also located on site and the large Hangar One venue hosts many events throughout the year.

Northampton (Sywell) Aerodrome has a CAA Ordinary Licence (Number P496) that allows flights for the public transport of passengers or for flying instruction as authorised by the licensee (Sywell Aerodrome Limited).

Second World War
The aerodrome opened in 1928 and during the Second World War the aerodrome, as RAF Sywell, was used as a training facility (de Havilland Tiger Moths) and later an important centre for the repair of Vickers Wellington bombers; extensive sheds from this time still remain on the site. Sywell also produced nearly 100 Avro Lancasters from 1942 to 1943. Among the Second World War pilots who underwent training at Sywell were Pierre Clostermann and Paddy Finucane, who soloed here.

Aerial shots for the film Battle of Britain were taken over the airport and nearby area.

Expansion
In 1999, the aerodrome sought planning permission for a hard runway, which was intended to allow operations to continue over the winter, when the grass runways often become waterlogged. The organisations STARE (Stop The Aerodrome Runway Expansion) and CPRE (Campaign to Protect Rural England) campaigned against this change, arguing that it would lead to more and larger aircraft flying over the area and disturb its "rural tranquility".

Permission was granted for the runway on 22 November 2007 by the Department for Transport, and though campaigners vowed to fight the decision they were unsuccessful and construction of the runway began in 2008. It opened during summer 2009 and enabled safe operations during the winter of 2009–2010 and onwards. In February 2010, the final inspection of the newly completed all-weather hard runway was carried out by the CAA who confirmed that it could be licensed for use.

Operations 
Sywell has three all-grass operational runways and a fourth all-weather concrete runway. The aerodrome's operational hours are 0900–1700 during winter and 0800-1700 during summer. The aerodrome offers an Aerodrome Flight Information Service to pilots.

Sywell Aviation Museum
In 2000, construction began on the Sywell Aviation Museum. It was competed in 2001 and opened by Alex Henshaw who had test-flown Vickers Wellingtons on the site during the Second World War. The Museum contains many artefacts and models telling the story of the site and the airmen who served there. Originally it comprised three Nissen huts, it was expanded from 2010 to 2012. with the addition of two more Nissen huts, and, in the summer of 2012, the museum acquired a Hawker Hunter airframe.

In March 2021 the Museum acquired its second complete aircraft 1969 built Handley Page Jetstream 200  G-RAVL. Jetstream aircraft were built at Sywell Aerodrome from 1971 to 1972 and this machine was not only the parent company (Jetstream Ltd) demonstrator but also won the Daily Express National Air Race Challenge Cup on 12 June 1971 in a race from Sywell to Biggin Hill which was televised on the BBC.

The Museum is a volunteer-run charitable trust and entry is free. It opens between Easter and September on weekends and bank holidays.

The Aviator Hotel

The original 1930s Clubhouse was developed over the years  - becoming a 'motel' in the 1960s. By the late 1990s the building was restored to its Art Deco glory and a further accommodation block added in a similar architectural style. The 3 star hotel now boasts 50 en suite rooms, a bar and restaurant and several function rooms. The Clubhouse, The Cockpit and The Briefing Room are small meeting rooms often used by local clubs and societies. The Cirrus Room is larger and caters for small events and weddings. Hangar One is a very large function space with its own bar and dancefloor which caters for larger corporate events, fairs and weddings.

Regular events at the Aerodrome include car festivals, the 'Pistons and Props' show in September (AKA 'The Sywell Classic'), craft fairs, balls, weddings, rallies, fly ins and 'car experience' days by 'Car Chase Heroes' etc.

Brooklands Flying Club
Brooklands Flying Club is based at Sywell, with a fleet of four Aero AT-3 aircraft and a Cessna 172. The club offers training for a Private Pilot's Licence (PPL), night rating and IMC rating.

The club opened in 2005 under the same name of the previous company that had been located on the airfield. Flights in a period De Havilland Tiger Moth aircraft are available as are trial flying lessons.

The Northamptonshire School of Flying (NSF) formerly based at Sywell moved to Sibson, Cambs in the 2000s and rebranded as Peterborough Aero Club.

Brooklands Engineering

Brooklands Engineering was formed October 2005 as an EASA approved Part-145 and PART-ML (Part-CAO) Maintenance organisation. BE repairs, services and sells all sorts of aircraft and is the main Fix Based Operator (FBO) at the aerodrome.

Brooklands Executive Air Travel

BEAT operate a Piper PA-31 Chieftain G-SYLL for executive charter from the aerodrome.

Training
Other flight training organisations on the airfield include:
Sloane Helicopters – helicopter training, sales and service of Robinson/Leonardo helicopters
Flylight Airsports – microlight training plus sales, manufacture, service of microlights

The Blades
The Blades aerobatic display team are based at Sywell, where their five Extra EA-300 aircraft are hangared. They perform aerobatic displays at major events around the country, in Europe, and in the Middle East. The team is the only one fully licensed by the CAA to carry paying 'passengers' in aerobatic displays, out of Sywell, or at many other locations.

In January 2023 The Blades announced that their 2022 season was their last and that they would be disbanding after 17 years of operations

 https://flyer.co.uk/blades-display-team-closes-after-17-years/

2 Excel, the parent company of The Blades also have subsidiary businesses at the aerodrome and under the 2Excel Broadsword banner operate air charter services with types ranging from a Beech King Air to a Boeing 737. They also undertake work for the UK Government most especially the UK Maritime & Coastguard Agency and Oil Spill Response using a modified Boeing 727 aircraft.

Air Leasing/Ultimate Warbirds

In January 2016, Air Leasing Ltd, operators of the famous 'Grace Spitfire- Supermarine Spitfire TR.IX ML407 moved to Sywell Aerodrome. Initially based in a new build 'blister' type hangar named 'The Spitfire Blister' but known locally as 'Graceland' – they have now expanded to fill two more. AL specialise in the maintenance and restoration of vintage 'warbird' type aircraft such as the Spitfire, Hurricane, P-51 Mustang and Sea Fury.

A subsidiary, Ultimate Warbird Flights, operate several two-seat warbirds for trial experience flights in Spitfire, Mustang, and Hispano Buchon aircraft. Four of the resident warbirds operate as the Ultimate Fighters display team  – usually displaying Mustang, Spitfire, Hispano Buchon and Thunderbolt aircraft across the UK and Europe.

Sywell Airshow
The aerodrome hosted a bi-annual charity airshow in aid of the local Air Ambulance where there were many classic aircraft flying and on display such as the Consolidated Catalina, North American P-51 Mustang, North American Harvards. The airshow is no longer hosted as of 2016, after the Shoreham Airshow crash. On 6 November 2020 flying legends announced its signature airshow, previously held at the IWM Duxford, would now transfer to Sywell Aerodrome. Cancelled in 2020 & 2021 due to COVID, the show was due to take place in 2022 but was subsequently also cancelled and the airshow is looking for a new home elsewhere.

Light Aircraft Association Rally
The Light Aircraft Association (LAA – formerly the Popular Flying Association), is one of the UK's several bodies supporting amateur aircraft construction, and recreational and sport flying. It used to hold its annual rally at Cranfield Airport, and then at Kemble Airport. In 2006, the LAA lost so much money through poor attendances resulting from poor weather that in 2007 and 2008, much smaller (and cheaper)  "regional rallies" were held. These were unpopular and in September 2009 a revived (if cut-down) LAA Rally was held at Sywell. This proved successful, and further well-attended rallies have taken place at Sywell since.

Previous events and users
Music in Flight was held at Sywell in the early 21st century. This combined orchestral music classical music with flying aircraft, hot air balloons, the Red Devils parachute display team and a fireworks display. The event subsequently moved to Biggin Hill.

Previous 'aviation experience' users of the aerodrome were Virgin Balloons, Warbird Experiences and Delta Aviation.

Business park
An industrial area in the complex accommodates firms, agencies and other commercial businesses.

References

External links

Sywell Aerodrome – official website
 – museum official website 

Airports in England
Transport in Northamptonshire
Rushden
Business parks of England
Royal Air Force stations in Northamptonshire
Airports in the East Midlands